Aurora Boulevard is a four-to-ten lane major thoroughfare in Quezon City and San Juan in Metro Manila, Philippines. It was named after Doña Aurora Quezon, the consort of Commonwealth President Manuel Luis Quezon. It is one of the major roads in the commercial district of Araneta City in Cubao. Line 2 follows the alignment of the boulevard.

Route description

Aurora Boulevard is divided into two routes, the Araneta Avenue to EDSA, and EDSA to Katipunan Avenue (C-5). Most of the road is a 4-lane dual carriageway, with Line 2 having five stations above ground, while one (Katipunan station) is located underground.

Aurora Boulevard starts as a physical extension of Ramon Magsaysay Boulevard past Araneta Avenue near the Manila-Quezon City boundary. It then enters San Juan before crossing Ermitaño Creek near Broadway Centrum to return to Quezon City, this time at the New Manila district. It then intersects Gilmore Avenue, Balete Drive, and E. Rodriguez Sr. Avenue, before it meets EDSA.

Past EDSA, it passes near the Araneta City in Cubao. The road continues eastward through barangays Silangan, Quirino 3-A and Duyan-Duyan, until it ends at Katipunan Avenue (C-5) near the Quezon City-Marikina boundary. It continues eastward to Rizal province as Marcos Highway.

History

A road from Katipunan Avenue to EDSA (Epifanio de los Santos Avenue), called Calle Quezon, was built in 1900. The section from EDSA to Gilmore Avenue had been renamed San Juan Road, classified as Highway 53, and was also known as Calle Morales. The portion from Gilmore Avenue to Dewey Boulevard, named Marikina-Ermita Avenue in 1955, was later reclaimed as Legarda Street, Recto Avenue, and Ramon Magsaysay Boulevard. As the road was constructed as an extension of Santa Mesa Boulevard (now Magsaysay Boulevard), it was also called the Santa Mesa Boulevard Extension Road.

The highway was then renamed Aurora Boulevard in 1963 to honor former First Lady Aurora Quezon, the assassinated consort of President Manuel L. Quezon. Magnolia Ice Cream House ice cream parlor and factory, was located at the corner of Aurora Boulevard and Doña Hemady Street (now occupied by Robinsons Magnolia).

Intersections

References

Streets in Metro Manila